Walter Stephenson Newman (July 20, 1895 – June 29, 1978) was the tenth President of Virginia Tech, serving from 1947 until 1962.

Early life and education

Walter Stephenson Newman was born in 1895 in Woodstock, Virginia to Walter and Sallie Newman. He earned his Bachelor's degree from Hampden-Sydney College, his master's from VPI and his Ph.D. from Pennsylvania State University.

Career

Newman taught Vocational Agriculture in Windsor, Virginia, and later was an associate professor in vocational education at VPI from 1922 to 1936 when he became state superintendent of vocational education. He also was the assistant superintendent of public instruction.  Additionally, he served as state administrator of the National Youth Administration from 1936 to 1942.  He was a highly respected educator and was one of the founders of the Future Farmers of Virginia which ultimately grew to become the National FFA Organization.

Newman returned to Virginia Tech as vice president in 1945, and took over as acting president in 1946 when John Redd Hutcheson became ill and had to be hospitalized. He was appointed president a year later in 1947. As president of Virginia Tech, he laid the groundwork for the small land grant college's development into a major research university. Newman conferred more degrees than all of his predecessors combined and oversaw more than $20,000,000 in campus construction. Newman put greater emphasis on research and graduate programs than any previous president, and several new graduate degree programs were established during his tenure.

Newman resigned from Virginia Tech after suffering a heart attack in 1961.  He later became president of the National Bank of Blacksburg, a position he held until his death.

Personal life

Newman married Liz Otey Hoge in 1923 and they had one son also named Walter.

Honors

Newman was the  first recipient of Virginia Tech's prestigious Ruffner Medal.  Newman Hall, a residence Hall on the Virginia Tech Campus, is named for Newman.

References

External links 

 Records of the Office of the President, Walter S. Newman, RG 2/10 at Virginia Tech Special Collections and University Archives
 Records of the Office of the Vice-President, Walter S. Newman, RG 3/1 at Virginia Tech Special Collections and University Archives
 Walter S. Newman Collection, Ms2015-006 at Virginia Tech Special Collections and University Archives
 

Virginia Tech alumni
Presidents of Virginia Tech
1895 births
1978 deaths
20th-century American academics